Leptonychia is a genus of flowering plants belonging to the family Malvaceae.

Its native range is Tropical Africa, Indo-China to New Guinea.

Species:

Leptonychia adolfi-friederici 
Leptonychia bampsii 
Leptonychia banahaensis 
Leptonychia batangensis 
Leptonychia brieyi 
Leptonychia caudata 
Leptonychia chrysocarpa 
Leptonychia densivenia 
Leptonychia devillei 
Leptonychia dewildei 
Leptonychia echinocarpa 
Leptonychia kamerunensis 
Leptonychia lanceolata 
Leptonychia lasiogyne 
Leptonychia ledermannii 
Leptonychia lokundjensis 
Leptonychia longicuspidata 
Leptonychia macrantha 
Leptonychia mayumbensis 
Leptonychia melanocarpa 
Leptonychia mildbraedii 
Leptonychia molundensis 
Leptonychia moyesiae 
Leptonychia multiflora 
Leptonychia occidentalis 
Leptonychia pallida 
Leptonychia pallidiflora 
Leptonychia parviflora 
Leptonychia pubescens 
Leptonychia semlikensis 
Leptonychia subtomentosa 
Leptonychia tenuipes 
Leptonychia tessmannii 
Leptonychia tokana 
Leptonychia urophylla 
Leptonychia usambarensis 
Leptonychia wagemansii 
Leptonychia youngii

References

Byttnerioideae
Malvaceae genera